Ghazwan Jassem (born 21 January 1988) is an Iraqi television presenter, Journalist, media personality, author of TV programs.
In 20 July 2018 become Executive Director of the Asia Network Television and Currently the Founder and General Manager of Alrabiaa Network Television

Education 
Ghazwan Jassem Mohan graduated from Baghdad University, specialising in media and received a bachelor's degree in media.

In 2009, he also attended the Academy of Media Industry and took elocution classes from Baghdad University.
He currently holds a Diploma in Applied Arts – Department of Architectural Decor and Bachelor of Political.

Career 
He worked in several satellite channels, among them:
 Belady TV
 Al Rasheed TV
 Aletejah TV
 Alsumaria
 Dijlah TV
 Asia Network Television since 20 July 2018 (Executive Director of the channel)
 Founder and General Manager of Alrabiaa Network Television. 2021- Now

References

External links 
Ghazwan Jassem on Facebook
Ghazwan Jassem on Instagram
Ghazwan Jassem on Twitter

Living people
1988 births
Iraqi television presenters
Iraqi television personalities
Iraqi broadcast news analysts